Mélina Robert-Michon (born 18 July 1979) is a French discus thrower. She was the silver medalist at the 2013 World Championships and  2016 Summer Olympics and the national record holder. She earned the bronze medal at the 2017 World Championships.

Discus career
At the 2013 World Championships in Moscow, Robert-Michon won the discus silver medal with her last throw - a distance of 66.28 metres - which broke her own national record (65.78 m) set 11 years prior on 17 July 2002. Her 66.28 metres was much better than her hitherto, 2013 best distance of 63.75m. She had never finished better than eighth place in the final in her four previous World Championships appearances.  She became the first male or female French athlete to win a World Championships medal in the discus event. Right after securing the silver medal, she told a television interviewer, "I had been working hard a long time for this. Since the start of the season, I said that I wanted to climb onto the podium. Many people laughed at it and did not quite believe it. I have been waiting so long for this.”

In December 2013, Robert-Michon was chosen as the 2013 French female athlete of the year, according to an Internet poll taken from the athletics fraternity, in which more than 2500 votes were cast over two weeks. The poll was conducted by the Fédération française d'athlétisme.

On 25 June 2016, Robert-Michon won her 16th French National Discus Championship, by throwing 63.40 m, less than 1 metre more than the runner-up Pauline Pousse (62.68 m). She finished fifth at the 2016 European Championships in Amsterdam with a throw of 62.47m in the final, after having thrown 63.99m in the qualifying round (which would have been good enough for the bronze medal).

Robert-Michon's achieved her best result in her fifth Olympic appearance at the 2016 Olympics in Rio de Janeiro. 16 years after her first Olympic appearance at the 2000 Olympics in Sydney, she won the silver medal at the age of 37; her throw of 66.73m in the final beat her own French national record and was 2.48 m less than the distance registered by the Croatian winner Sandra Perković. Robert-Michon finished in 2nd place at both the 2016 Meeting de Paris (27 August, 64.36 m) and the 2016 Weltklasse Zurich (1 September, 63.91 m), behind the winner Sandra Perković in both competitions.

In December 2016, she was chosen for the second in her career as the 2016 French female athlete of the year, ahead of trail-runner Caroline Cheverot and 800 m European silver medalist Rénelle Lamote.

After a difficult season struggled by minor injuries, the French managed to win the bronze medal at the World Championships in London behind Croatia's Sandra Perković and Australia's Dani Stevens, both former world champions. Her result of 66.21m is her best throw of the season, and the third best of his career (behind 66.73m in 2016 and 66.28m in 2013).

In January 2018, she retained her « French female athlete of the year award » for the second consecutive year, this time for 2017, well ahead of world trail-runner champion Adeline Roche and 400 m runner Floria Gueï. She is the first athlete to win three times the award.

Family
Robert-Michon has a daughter named Elyssa, born on 24 August 2010. On 5 December 2017, she announced her second pregnancy.

Results in international competitions
Note: Only the position and distance in the final are indicated, unless otherwise stated. (q) means the athlete did not qualify for the final, with the overall position and distance in the qualification round indicated.

References

External links

1979 births
Living people
People from Voiron
French female discus throwers
Olympic athletes of France
Athletes (track and field) at the 2000 Summer Olympics
Athletes (track and field) at the 2004 Summer Olympics
Athletes (track and field) at the 2008 Summer Olympics
Athletes (track and field) at the 2012 Summer Olympics
Athletes (track and field) at the 2016 Summer Olympics
World Athletics Championships athletes for France
World Athletics Championships medalists
European Athletics Championships medalists
Medalists at the 2016 Summer Olympics
Olympic silver medalists in athletics (track and field)
Olympic silver medalists for France
Mediterranean Games gold medalists for France
Athletes (track and field) at the 2009 Mediterranean Games
Universiade medalists in athletics (track and field)
Sportspeople from Isère
Mediterranean Games medalists in athletics
Universiade bronze medalists for France
French Athletics Championships winners
Medalists at the 2001 Summer Universiade
Athletes (track and field) at the 2020 Summer Olympics